Syd Dyer (25 May 1916 – 7 April 1976), also referred to as Sid Dyer, was an Australian rules footballer who played for North Melbourne in the Victorian Football League (VFL).

Dyer twice finished equal sixth in the annual Brownlow Medal count, first in 1939 and again in 1946. He won the Syd Barker Medal in 1939 for North Melbourne's best and fairest player and also twice topped their goalkicking, in 1946 with 55 goals and the following season with 47.

References

External links

1916 births
Australian rules footballers from Victoria (Australia)
North Melbourne Football Club players
Syd Barker Medal winners
1976 deaths